Jeppe Bay Madsen (born 4 March 1997) is a Danish badminton player. Bay started playing badminton in Helsingør in 2003 and entered the junior national team in 2007. He won his first BWF Tour title at the 2020 SaarLorLux Open in the men's doubles event with Lasse Mølhede.

Achievements

BWF World Tour 
The BWF World Tour, which was announced on 19 March 2017 and implemented in 2018, is a series of elite badminton tournaments sanctioned by the Badminton World Federation (BWF). The BWF World Tour is divided into levels of World Tour Finals, Super 1000, Super 750, Super 500, Super 300 (part of the HSBC World Tour), and the BWF Tour Super 100.

Men's doubles

BWF International Challenge/Series 
Men's doubles

Mixed doubles

  BWF International Challenge tournament
  BWF International Series tournament
  BWF Future Series tournament

References

External links 
 

1997 births
Living people
People from Helsingør
Danish male badminton players
Sportspeople from the Capital Region of Denmark